CoRoT-19b is a transiting exoplanet found by the CoRoT space telescope in 2011.

It is a hot Jupiter-sized planet orbiting a F9V star with Te = 6090K, M = 1.21M☉, R = 1.65R☉, and near-solar metallicity. It has an estimated age between 4.0 and 6.0 Gyr.

References

Hot Jupiters
Transiting exoplanets
Exoplanets discovered in 2011
19b